The 2012 NRL season consisted of 26 weekly regular season rounds starting on 1 March, followed by four weeks of play-offs that culminated in the grand final on 30 September. The finals format for 2012 was also changed, with the new ARL Commission dispensing with the McIntyre final eight system and replacing it with the finals system employed previously by the ARL in the 1990s.

Regular season

Round 1

Source: NRL 2012 Round 1 – RL Project
After five previous unsuccessful attempts, the St George Illawarra Dragons became the last club to win a match in golden point extra time.
The North Queensland Cowboys were held scoreless for the first time since 2006, and at home since 2003.
This round saw the NRL premiership coaching debuts of the Dragons' Steve Price, the Sea Eagles' Geoff Toovey, the Warriors' Brian McClennan and the Rabbitohs' Michael Maguire.
2012's Round 1 set a new record in television ratings for an opening round, up 9% on the previous season's.
 This Round was the 9th (and as of Round 15 2014, last) time since Golden Point's inception in 2003 that there were 2 Golden Point games in the same week.

Round 2

Source: NRL 2012 Round 2 – RL Project
The Gold Coast lost at home to Canberra for the first time.
Canterbury defeated St. George Illawarra for the first time since Round 6, 2008.
Penrith prevented their opposition scoring a try for the first time since Round 17, 2003, breaking an alltime record streak of 208 games
The Round 2 attendance total of 158,006 set a new record for Round 2, exceeding the previous high of 148,127 in 2009.
The Round 2 attendance total exceeded the Round 1 total for the first time since 1996.

Round 3

Source: NRL 2012 Round 3 – RL Project

Round 4

Source: NRL 2012 Round 4 – RL Project
Parramatta's four losses to begin a season is the first time it has done so since 1991.
Canberra defeated the Wests Tigers for the first time since Round 5, 2008, and at Campbelltown for the first time since Round 23, 2006.

Round 5 - Heritage Round

Source: NRL 2012 Round 5 – RL Project

Round 6

Source: NRL 2012 Round 6 – RL Project
 The Round 6 attendance total of 155,054 set a new record for Round 6, exceeding the previous high of 152,371 in 1995 (10 games).

Round 7

Source: NRL 2012 Round 7 – RL Project
For the first time since Round 26, 2005, St. George Illawarra defeated Newcastle on any of its home grounds.
 For the first time since Round 13 2005, the Cowboys scored 50 or more points against an opponent.
 For the first time in the Panthers history and the 10th time in NRL history, they were held to nil in 2 consecutive games, becoming the first team since West Tigers in Rounds 15 & 16 2004 to do this, it was also the first time the West Tigers held a team to nil in the joint venture's history, and the first time since Round 18 1998 either team in the merger held a team to nil.

Round 8

Source: NRL 2012 Round 8 – RL Project
The Melbourne Storm became the first team since the Sydney Roosters in 1996 to open a season with eight successive wins.
The South Sydney Rabbitohs won their 1,000th ever premiership match.
Parramatta scored 30 points in 13 minutes, as they fell short of what would have been the greatest ever comeback in NRL history.

Round 9

Source: NRL 2012 Round 9 – RL Project
Parramatta recorded its worst start to a season since 1960.
Matt Prior became the first player to be sent off this season for his elbow hit to Cowboys captain Johnathan Thurston.

Round 10

Source: NRL 2012 Round 10 – RL Project

Round 11
Players selected for Game I of the 2012 State of Origin series were not available for this round.

Source: NRL 2012 Round 11 – RL Project
 The Dragons became the 5th team to play Golden Point in consecutive weeks.

Round 12

Source: NRL 2012 Round 12 – RL Project

Round 13

Source: NRL 2012 Round 13 – RL Project

Round 14

Source: NRL 2012 Round 14 – RL Project

Round 15

Source: NRL 2012 Round 15 – RL Project
For only the second time in the club's history, the Brisbane Broncos were held scoreless in Queensland, it was also the first time the Cowboys have held a team scoreless since the 2005 Preliminary Final.

Round 16 - Women in League round

Source: NRL 2012 Round 16 – RL Project
Petero Civoniceva (Brisbane) became the 17th player in premiership history to play 300 games.

Round 17

Source: NRL 2012 Round 17 – RL Project

Round 18

Source:

Round 19 - Rivalry Round #1

Source:

Round 20 - Rivalry Round #2

Source:

Round 21

Source:
 The Warriors became the first team in history to surrender an 18-point lead 2 weeks in a row.

Round 22 - Close the Gap Round

Source:
 The Sharks win over the Warriors was the biggest winning margin in the entire 2012 NRL Season.

Round 23

Source: NRL 2012 Round 23 – RL Project

Round 24

Source:
 This Round Dragons and Knights both had their finals hopes killed off this week against the Cowboys and Sea Eagles respectively.
 The Tigers played their 4th Golden point game in the season, becoming just the 3rd team to do so.

Round 25

Source: NRL 2012 Round 25 – RL Project
 Parramatta's loss made it mathematically impossible for them to avoid their first wooden spoon since 1972, after Penrith had beaten the Titans the day before to go 2 wins clear and kill off the Titans finals aspirations in the process.

Round 26

Source:
 The final 8 was confirmed after the Tigers-Storm game, which the Tigers lost 26-6, meaning from this point on no other team could make the 8.
 The Bulldogs won their first Minor Premiership since 1994 with their 42-10 win over the Roosters.

Finals

Week 1 - Qualifying and Elimination Finals
1st qualifying final

 This was the first Finals meeting between these 2 clubs since the 1995 Grand Final.
2nd qualifying final

 This was the first Finals game between these 2 sides.
1st elimination final

 This was the first Finals game since 2004 between these 2 sides.
2nd elimination final

Week 2 - Semi-finals
1st semi-final

2nd semi-final

 This was the first final between these 2 clubs since 1989, and Souths first Finals win since 1987.

Week 3 - Preliminary Finals
1st Preliminary Final

 Souths' loss was their 917th in first grade, surpassing the previous record held by Norths
 This was the first time since 1988 these 2 teams played each other in a Finals match.

2nd Preliminary Final

Week 4 - Grand Final

 This was the first Grand Final meeting between these 2 sides.
 It was the Storm's first Grand Final since 2009 which they won 23-16, although it was stripped the next year after they were found guilty of Salary Cap cheating, for the Bulldogs it was their first decider since 2004 where they defeated the Roosters 16-13, it was the first time since the 2006 Grand Final that both Grand Finalists won their last Grand Final.
 Melbourne won their first legal title since 1999.
 For the first time since 2008, the first and second placed teams at the end of the regular season played off in the grand final, and like that decider, the 2nd placed team prevailed over the Minor Premiers.

References 

National Rugby League season results
Results